Cuba competed at the 2020 Summer Olympics in Tokyo. Originally scheduled to take place from 24 July to 9 August 2020, the Games were postponed to 23 July to 8 August 2021, because of the COVID-19 pandemic. The Cuban delegation was their smallest (and first with fewer than 100 athletes) since 1964, which coincidentally was also in Tokyo. It was the nation's twenty-first appearance at the Summer Olympics. Cuba improved on its 2016 result, by winning 7 gold and 15 total medals after 5 and 11 in Rio.

Medalists

| width="78%" align="left" valign="top" |

| width="22%" align="left" valign="top" |

Competitors
The following is the list of number of competitors participating in the Games:

Athletics

Cuban athletes further achieved the entry standards, either by qualifying time or by world ranking, in the following track and field events (up to a maximum of 3 athletes in each event):

Track & road events

Field events
Men

Women

Combined events – Women's heptathlon

Boxing

Cuba entered seven male boxers to compete in each of the following weight classes into the Olympic tournament. With the cancellation of the 2021 Pan American Qualification Tournament in Buenos Aires, all of them, led by Rio 2016 gold medalists Arlen López (men's light heavyweight) and Julio César La Cruz (men's heavyweight), finished among the top five of their respective weight divisions to secure their places on the Cuban squad based on the IOC's Boxing Task Force Rankings for the Americas.

Canoeing

Sprint
Cuban canoeists qualified two boats in each of the following distances for the Games through the 2019 ICF Canoe Sprint World Championships in Szeged, Hungary. With the cancellation of the 2021 Pan American Championships, Cuba accepted the invitation from the International Canoe Federation to send a canoeist in the men's C-1 1000 m to the Games.

Qualification Legend: FA = Qualify to final (medal); FB = Qualify to final B (non-medal)

Cycling

Road
Cuba entered one rider to compete in the women's Olympic road race, by virtue of her top 22 national finish (for women) in the UCI World Ranking.

Gymnastics

Artistic
Cuba entered one artistic gymnast into the Olympic competition. Rio 2016 Olympian Marcia Videaux finished among the top twenty eligible for qualification in the women's individual all-around and apparatus events, respectively, to book her spot on the Cuban roster at the 2019 World Championships in Stuttgart, Germany.

Women

Judo
 
Cuba qualified six judoka (three per gender) for each of the following weight classes at the Games. Five of them, with three-time medalist Idalys Ortiz (women's heavyweight, +78 kg) leading the squad at her fourth straight Olympics, were selected among the top 18 judoka of their respective weight classes based on the IJF World Ranking List of June 28, 2021. Meanwhile, Rio 2016 Olympian Magdiel Estrada accepted a continental berth from the Americas as the nation's top-ranked judoka outside of direct qualifying position.

Modern pentathlon
 
Cuban athletes qualified for the following spots to compete in modern pentathlon. Lester Ders and Rio 2016 Olympian Leydi Moya secured a selection each in the men's and women's event respectively by virtue of their top-five finish at the 2019 Pan American Games in Lima.

Rowing

Cuba qualified one boat in the women's single sculls for the Games by finishing fourth in the A-final and securing the fourth of five berths available at the 2021 FISA Americas Olympic Qualification Regatta in Rio de Janeiro, Brazil.

Qualification Legend: FA=Final A (medal); FB=Final B (non-medal); FC=Final C (non-medal); FD=Final D (non-medal); FE=Final E (non-medal); FF=Final F (non-medal); SA/B=Semifinals A/B; SC/D=Semifinals C/D; SE/F=Semifinals E/F; QF=Quarterfinals; R=Repechage

Shooting

Cuban shooters achieved quota places for the following events by virtue of their best finishes at the 2018 ISSF World Championships, the 2019 ISSF World Cup series, the 2019 Pan American Games, and Championships of the Americas, as long as they obtained a minimum qualifying score (MQS) by May 31, 2020.

Swimming

Cuba received a universality invitation from FINA to send two top-ranked swimmers (one per gender) in their respective individual events to the Olympics, based on the FINA Points System of June 28, 2021.

Table tennis
 
Cuba entered two athletes into the table tennis competition at the Games. Daniela Fonseca scored a second-stage final triumph to notch the last ticket available in the women's singles and then teamed up with her partner and Rio 2016 Olympian Jorge Campos to seal an outright victory and a mixed doubles berth at the 2021 Latin American Qualification Tournament in Rosario, Argentina.

Taekwondo

Cuba entered one athlete into the taekwondo competition at the Games. Rio 2016 Olympian and double world champion Rafael Alba secured a spot in the men's heavyweight category (+80 kg) with a top two finish at the 2020 Pan American Qualification Tournament in San José, Costa Rica.

Volleyball

Beach
Cuba women's beach volleyball team qualified for the Olympics by winning the gold medal at the 2018–2020 NORCECA Continental Cup Final in Colima, Mexico.

Weightlifting

Cuba entered four weightlifters (one man and three women) into the Olympic competition. Rio 2016 Olympian Marina Rodríguez finished seventh of the eight highest-ranked weightlifters in the women's 64 kg category based on the IWF Absolute World Rankings, with rookies Olfides Sáez (men's 96 kg), Ludia Montero (women's 49 kg), and Eyurkenia Pileta (women's +87 kg) topping the field of weightlifters vying for qualification from the Americas in their respective weight categories based on the IWF Absolute Continental Rankings.

Wrestling

Cuba qualified twelve wrestlers for each of the following classes into the Olympic competition. Two of them finished among the top six to book Olympic spots in the men's Greco-Roman (67 and 130 kg) at the 2019 World Championships, while ten more licenses were awarded to Cuban wrestlers, who progressed to the top two finals at the 2020 Pan American Qualification Tournament in Ottawa, Canada.

Freestyle

Greco-Roman

See also
Cuba at the 2019 Pan American Games

Notes and references

Nations at the 2020 Summer Olympics
2020
2021 in Cuban sport